Myrmecophilus or ant crickets, is a genus of orthopteran insects in the family Myrmecophilidae. This genus contains the majority of myrmecophilous (ant-loving) species in this small, obscure family.

Species
With a worldwide distribution, species include:
M. acervorum (Panzer, 1799)
M. aequispina Chopard, 1923
M. americanus Saussure, 1877
M. arboreus Maeyama & Terayama, 1994
M. australis Tepper, 1896
M. baronii Baccetti, 1966
M. brevipalpis Chopard, 1948
M. bifasciatus Fischer von Waldheim, 1846
M. bituberculatus Ingrisch, 2001
M. chocolatinus Gorochov, 1992
M. concolor Chopard, 1928
M. cottami Chopard, 1922
M. crenatus Gorochov, 1986
M. denticaudus Bei-Bienko, 1967
M. dubius Saussure, 1877
M. escherichi Schimmer, 1911
M. formosanus Shiraki, 1930
M. gigas Ichikawa, 2001
M. gracilipes Chopard, 1924
M. haeckeli Fernando, 1962
M. hebardi Mann, 1920
M. hirticaudus Fischer von Waldheim, 1846
M. horii Maruyama, 2004
M. inaequalis Ingrisch, 2010
M. ishikawai Maruyama, 2004
M. keyi Baccetti, 1975
M. kinomurai Maruyama, 2004
M. kubotai Maruyama, 2004
M. leei Kistner & Chong, 2007
M. longitarsis Chopard, 1925
M. manni Schimmer, 1911
M. mauritanicus (H. Lucas, 1849)
M. mayaealberti Hugel & Matyot, 2006
M. mjobergi Chopard, 1925
M. myrmecophilus (Savi, 1819)
M. nigricornis Chopard, 1963
M. nebrascensis Lugger, 1898
M. nonveilleri Ingrisch & Pavicévić, 2008
M. ochraceus Fischer, 1853
M. oculatus Miram, 1930
M. oregonensis Bruner, 1884
M. orientalis Stalling, 2010
M. pallidithorax Chopard, 1930
M. parachilnus (Otte & Alexander, 1983)
M. pergandei Bruner, 1884
M. polyrhachi Ingrisch, 1987
M. quadrispina Perkins, 1899
M. sanctaehelenae Chopard, 1970
M. sapporensis Matsumura, 1904
M. seychellensis Gorochov, 1994
M. sinicus Bei-Bienko, 1956
M. surcoufi Chopard, 1919
M. teranishii Teranishi, 1914
M. termitophilus Maran, 1959
M. testaceus Chopard, 1925
M. tetramorii Ichikawa, 2001
M. tindalei Otte & Alexander, 1983
M. wahrmani Chopard, 1963
M. zorae Karaman, 1963

External links

Myrmecophilus.de (in German)

Ensifera genera